Greatest Hits is a compilation album by American country music artist Waylon Jennings, released in 1979 by RCA Records.

Background
The LP mostly documents Jennings' outlaw country years for RCA Records during the 1970s and includes several of his most well-known signature songs, the most recent of which had been the title track of the album I've Always Been Crazy, issued the year before. "Only Daddy That'll Walk The Line", released in 1968, is the oldest track. Excluding the Mackintosh & T.J. soundtrack album and the White Mansions concept album, Greatest Hits became Jennings' eighth consecutive release to reach #1 on the charts; it was also one of his last chart-topping records, with What Goes Around Comes Around, released that same year, peaking at #2.

"Amanda" was originally issued on Jennings' 1974 album The Ramblin' Man, but had not been released as a single at that time. More than 4½ years later, new overdubs were added to the original track and the song was included on this greatest hits album. "Amanda" was issued as a single simultaneously with the album in April, 1979  and the song soon became one of the biggest country hits of the year.

The album has been 5× Platinum certified by the Recording Industry Association of America (RIAA) and 3× Platinum by Music Canada.  RCA first issued the original 11-track album on compact disc in 1984; in 1989, RCA reissued the album on CD and cassette with the songs resequenced and omitting two tracks ("Ladies Love Outlaws" and "Only Daddy That'll Walk The Line"). This is the version of the CD currently available.

Track listing

1979 release
"Lonesome, On'ry and Mean" (Young) – 3:38
From Lonesome, On'ry and Mean (1973)
"Ladies Love Outlaws" (Clayton) – 2:32
From Ladies Love Outlaws (1972)
"I've Always Been Crazy" (Jennings) – 4:11
From I've Always Been Crazy (1978)
"I'm a Ramblin' Man" (Ray Pennington) – 2:46
From The Ramblin' Man (1974)
"Only Daddy That'll Walk The Line" (Bryant) – 2:20
From Only the Greatest (1968)
"Amanda" (McDill) – 2:56
New overdub of a song that had appeared on The Ramblin' Man (1974)
"Honky Tonk Heroes" (Billy Joe Shaver) – 3:27
From Honky Tonk Heroes (1973)
"Mammas Don't Let Your Babies Grow Up to Be Cowboys" (Bruce, Bruce) – 2:32
With Willie Nelson
From Waylon and Willie (1978)
"Good Hearted Woman" (Jennings, Nelson) – 2:59
With Willie Nelson
From Wanted! The Outlaws (1976)
"Luckenbach, Texas (Back to the Basics of Love)" (Emmons, Moman) – 3:19
From Ol' Waylon (1977)
"Are You Sure Hank Done It This Way" (Jennings) – 2:55
From Dreaming My Dreams (1975)

1989 release
"Lonesome, On'ry and Mean" (Young) – 3:38
"I've Always Been Crazy" (Jennings) – 4:11
"Honky Tonk Heroes" (Shaver) – 3:27
"Luckenbach, Texas (Back to the Basics of Love)" (Emmons, Moman) – 3:19
"I'm a Ramblin' Man" (Pennington) – 2:46
"Amanda" (McDill) – 2:56
"Mamas Don't Let Your Babies Grow up to Be Cowboys" (Bruce, Bruce) – 2:32 (with Willie Nelson)
"A Good Hearted Woman" (Jennings, Nelson) – 2:59
"Are You Sure Hank Done It This Way" (Jennings) – 2:55

Charts

Weekly charts

Year-end charts

Certifications

References

Waylon Jennings compilation albums
Albums produced by Chips Moman
Albums produced by Jack Clement
Albums produced by Chet Atkins
1979 greatest hits albums
RCA Victor compilation albums